The 1986–87 TCU Horned Frogs men's basketball team represented Texas Christian University as a member of the Southwestern Conference during the 1986–87 men's college basketball season. Led by head coach Jim Killingsworth, TCU won the regular season conference title and received an at-large bid to the NCAA tournament as No. 4 seed in the East region. After an opening round victory over Marshall, the Horned Frogs were beaten by No. 5 seed Notre Dame, 58–57, in the round of 32. The team finished with a record of 24–7 (14–2 SWC).

Roster

Schedule

|-
!colspan=9 style=| Regular season

|-
!colspan=9 style=| SWC tournament

|-
!colspan=9 style=| NCAA tournament

Rankings

References 

TCU Horned Frogs men's basketball seasons
TCU
TCU Basketball
TCU Basketball
TCU